| tries = {{#expr:
 6 + 2 +
 12 +
 14 + 1
}}
| top scorer =  Claudia Peña Hidalgo (38 points)
| most tries =  Alba Vinuesa García (5 tries)
| website    = Rugby Europe
| preceded by = 2022
| succeeded by =2024
}}

The 2023 Rugby Europe Women's Championship was the 26th edition of Rugby Europe's first division competition for women's national rugby union teams. It was celebrated on February 2023, and the winner will classify to the first edition of WXV.

Standings

Results

Leading scorers

Most points

Most tries

References

2023
Rugby Europe Women's Championship
Rugby union in the Netherlands
Rugby union in Spain
Rugby union in Sweden
2022–23 in European rugby union
2023 in women's rugby union
Rugby Europe Women's Championship
Rugby Europe Women's Championship